Bad Habits is the second studio album by Canadian rapper Nav. It was released through XO Records and Republic Records on March 22, 2019. The album features guest appearances from The Weeknd, Meek Mill, Young Thug, Gunna, and Lil Durk. The deluxe edition was released four days later on March 26, 2019. It features additional guest appearances from Future and then-XO labelmate duo 88Glam. It follows his previous album, Reckless (2018), as well as his unofficial Brown Boy EP, released a week and a day before Bad Habits.  The album debuted at number one on the US Billboard 200, becoming Nav's first US chart-topping album.

Background
On March 17, 2019, CashXO released NAV’s Brown Boy EP which consisted of 5 tracks exclusively on Audiomack announced the album's title and release date.

The cover art was revealed via Instagram on March 19, 2019, with the tracklist on March 21, 2019.

A track titled "Habits" featuring Lil Uzi Vert was supposed to be released on the album. According to Nav, the heads of Lil Uzi Vert's label, DJ Drama and Don Cannon, would not legally clear Lil Uzi Vert's verse. In a statement to Complex, DJ Drama said, "It's not about the money because we turned down $100k."

On March 26, 2019, the deluxe version of Bad Habits was released, which features new guest appearances from Future and 88Glam, alongside all the songs from the Brown Boy EP. The originally unreleased track "Habits" which was supposed to feature Lil Uzi Vert, was also released as a solo version. According to Nav, he recorded Lil Uzi Vert's verse himself and put it on the song.

Singles
The album's lead single, "Know Me", was released for digital download on November 2, 2018. The song was produced by Pro Logic and Austin Powerz. The music video was released on November 8, 2018. The music video was directed by David Camarena. The song peaked at number sixty-three on the Billboard Canadian Hot 100. "Price on My Head", featuring Canadian singer-songwriter the Weeknd, was released as the second single on March 26, 2019, the same day that Nav released the deluxe edition of the album. "Tap", featuring American rapper Meek Mill, was released as the third single on May 7, 2019.

Critical reception

Bad Habits received mixed reviews from music critics, citing a lack of boldness and originality. At Metacritic, which assigns a normalized rating out of 100 to reviews from mainstream publications, the album received an average score of 52, based on 4 reviews, indicating "mixed or average" reviews.

Commercial performance
Bad Habits debuted at number one on the US Billboard 200 with 82,000 album-equivalent units, of which 24,000 were pure album sales in its first week. The reason for the high sales are mostly due to merchandise bundles which resulted in about 20,000 extra sales. The became Nav's first US number-one album. The album also accumulated a total of 79.08 million on-demand audio streams for the album’s songs, making it the most streamed album of the week. In its second week, the album dropped to number six on the chart, earning an additional 35,000 units that week. On May 20, 2020, the album was certified gold by the Recording Industry Association of America (RIAA) for combined sales and album-equivalent units of over 500,000 units.

In Nav's home country of Canada, Bad Habits debuted at number one on the Canadian Albums Chart, selling 10,000 album-equivalent units in its first week. On June 26, 2019, the album was certified gold by Music Canada (MC) for sales of over 40,000 copies in Canada.

Track listing
Credits adapted from Tidal.

Notes
  signifies a co-producer
  signifies an additional producer
  signifies an uncredited co-producer
 "Go to Hell", "8 to a 4", "Never Know", "OK" (featuring Lil Durk), and "Athlete" were originally from Nav's Brown Boy EP, that his manager Cash leaked eight days before the album's release.

Personnel
All programming and keyboards are credited to the producers of each track, except where noted.

Musicians
 WondaGurl – keyboards , programming 
 Money Musik – keyboards (track 3, 5, 7–9, 11–15, 21–24), programming (track 3, 5, 7–9, 11–15, 21–24)
 London on da Track – keyboards , programming 
 Mixx – keyboards , programming 
 Pro Logic – programming 
 Austin Powerz – programming 
 Wheezy – programming 
 Frost -keyboards (track 5, 7, 11, 14, 21, 23-24) programming (track 5, 7, 11, 14, 21, 23-24)
 Mike Michael – keyboards 
Technical
 Pro Logic – mixing , engineer 
 Trouble Trouble – engineer 
 Shin Kamiyama – engineer 
 AlexOnWeed – engineer 
 Ethan Stevens – engineer 
 Mixx – engineer 
 Chemist – engineer 
 Chris Athens – mastering

Charts

Weekly charts

Year-end charts

Certifications

References

2019 albums
Nav (rapper) albums
Albums produced by Nav (rapper)
Albums produced by Cubeatz
Albums produced by WondaGurl
Albums produced by London on da Track
Albums produced by Tay Keith
Albums produced by Wheezy
Republic Records albums